The Chandio is a Baloch tribe in the Sindh and Balochistan provinces of Pakistan and Iran.

The Chandio tribe follows a tribal system, with their tribal leader Nawab Ghaibi Sardar Khan Chandio.

Notable people with this name
 
  
Jalal Chandio (1944 – 2001), Sindhi music folk singer
Maula Bakhsh Chandio, Member, Senate of Pakistan

References

Baloch tribes
Social groups of Pakistan